Vitéz Miklós Kozma de Leveld (5 September 1884 – 8 December 1941) was a Hungarian politician, who served as Interior Minister between 1935 and 1937. He was also Minister of Defence for a short time in the cabinet of Gyula Gömbös. He attended the Ludovika Academy and fought in World War I. He was the supporter of Miklós Horthy from the begins (Counter-government of Szeged). He worked as head of the Magyar Távirati Iroda (MTI) from 1922 until his death. He did not agree with the Prime Minister Kálmán Darányi's moderate policy, so he resigned the position of the Minister of the Interior.

After the ministership Kozma continued his radical politics, he wanted to attack Carpathian Ruthenia (Kárpátalja) with the Rongyos Gárda at which time it was part of Czechoslovakia, but the government talked him out of this plan. The Rongyos Gárda had encountered the Slovak army after they filtered into the region. After the occupation Miklós Kozma was appointed as governor of Kárpátalja. He played a major role in the starting of the first Jewish deportation in Hungary, beginning with non-Hungarian Jews, including those who had escaped from surrounding countries into Hungary. Many of these deportees soon became victims of the Kamianets-Podilskyi Massacre.

References
 Magyar Életrajzi Lexikon

External links
 

1884 births
1941 deaths
People from Oradea
People from the Kingdom of Hungary
Unity Party (Hungary) politicians
Hungarian Interior Ministers
Defence ministers of Hungary
Hungarian soldiers